Skavlan was a Norwegian-Swedish television talk show hosted by Norwegian journalist Fredrik Skavlan. It premiered in Sweden on Sveriges Television (SVT) in January 2009, and the first guests to appear on the show were former Prime Minister of Sweden Göran Persson and his wife Anitra Steen. On 8 May 2009, it was announced that Skavlan had been renewed for a second season. It was also announced that the show would no longer only be produced by SVT in Sweden; Skavlan would now be partly produced in Norway by the Norwegian Broadcasting Corporation (NRK). The first twelve episodes of Skavlans second season were produced by SVT in Sweden, and the remaining twelve by NRK in Norway. It was then produced by Monkberry, who took over production duties from the 4th season, run by presenter Fredrik Skavlan and producer Marianne Torp-Kierulf.

The programme was filmed at TV-huset (sv), SVT's studio complex in Stockholm, with episodes also filmed at Sky Studios in London, and Chelsea Studios in New York. London episodes were previously filmed at BBC Television Centre and ITV's London Studios.

History 
Skavlan was one of Europe's largest and longest running talk shows, offering interviews with some of the world's best-known personalities. Airing during prime time on Friday evenings, Skavlan was produced by Monkberry for Norwegian NRK and Swedish SVT. The show had an audience market share of 50% in Norway and 40% in Sweden with 2.5 to 3 million viewers per show. The show also aired in Finland and had a large Internet following. To date, some of Fredrik's guests have included:

 Adele
 Zara Larsson
 Bill Gates
 Nicole Kidman
 Rihanna
 Woody Allen
 Robbie Williams
 Uma Thurman
 Taylor Swift
 Bob Geldof
 Steven Van Zandt
 Isabella Rosselini
 Pamela Anderson
 Noel Gallagher
 Bill Clinton
 Emmylou Harris
 Robin Gibb
 Wyclef Jean
 Kofi Annan
 Cat Stevens
 Desmond Tutu
 Julio Iglesias
 Lars Ulrich
 Jeff Koons
 Paul Auster
 Jonathan Franzen
 Lena Olin
 PJ Harvey
 Tom Jones
 Eddie Izzard
 Malala Yousafzai
 Boris Becker
 Juliette Lewis
 Michael Palin
 Slash
 Amy Winehouse
 Florence and the Machine
 Liv Ullmann
 Susanne Sundfør
 Al Gore
 David Guetta
 Daniel Kahneman
 Leonard Cohen
 Richard Dawkins
 Joe Cocker
 Garry Kasparov
 The Killers
 Ronan Keating
 Jay-Z
 Dua Lipa
 Josh Groban
 Kylie Minogue
 John Irving
 Paulo Coelho
 Ben Kingsley
 Jon Bon Jovi
 Pelé
 Tove Lo
 Vince Vaughn
 Bruno Mars
 Lena Dunham
 Rosanne Cash
 Marianne Faithfull
 Joss Stone
 Natascha Kampusch
 Amos Oz
 Justin Bieber
 Dolph Lundgren
 Paul Krugman
 Sting
 Sarah, Duchess of York
 Elvis Costello
 Ellie Goulding
 Jamie Cullum
 John Mayer
 Nikolaj Coster-Waldau
 Mark Knopfler
 Will Smith
 James May
 Father John Misty
 Muhammad Yunus
 Jo Nesbø
 Bianca Jagger
 Isabel Allende
 Norah Jones
 Ken Follett
 Katie Melua
 Kat Von D
 Annie Lennox
 Mads Mikkelsen
 Malcolm Gladwell
 Jared Leto
 Emeli Sandé
 Andrea Bocelli
 Gordon Ramsay
 Bryan Ferry
 Mario Vargas Llosa
 Michael Bublé
 Steven Pinker
 Robert Plant
 David Walliams
 Shakira
 Kenneth Branagh
 Lorde
 John Legend
 Richard Ayoade
 Ian McEwan
 Tony Blair
 Helle Thorning-Schmidt
 Kevin Costner
 Juliette Binoche
 Matt Dillon
 John Cleese
 Paul McCartney
 Chrissie Hynde
 Alicia Keys
 Kathy Griffin
 Jimmie Åkesson
 Kygo
 Vegard Ylvisåker
 Bård Ylvisåker
 Tarjei Sandvik Moe
 Josefine Frida Pettersen
 PewDiePie
 Jan Böhmermann
 Alexander Rybak
 Benjamin Ingrosso
 Ann Coulter
 Jordan Peterson
 Annie Lööf
 Joan Baez
 Patti Smith
 Lewis Capaldi
 Greta Thunberg
 Ant Middleton
 David Blaine
 Armand Duplantis
 Anderson .Paak
 Dolly Parton
 Ricky Gervais
 Astrid S
 Stephen Fry
 Dave Grohl

List of episodes

Episodes

Season 1 (2009)

Season 2 (2009–10)

Season 3 (2010–11)

Season 4 (2011–12)

Season 5 (2012–13)

Criticism 
The show received criticism from leading intellectuals and some of their female guests, accusing Fredrik Skavlan of being sexist and asking impertinent questions and flirting with his female guests. Carolina Gynning told Swedish media that she found his questions "demeaning". Skavlan retaliated in an interview with the Swedish newspaper Expressen in which he said that the accusations were "absurd" and that he considered himself to be a feminist.

Skavlan encountered some criticism from Norwegian viewers for his tough interview with former Icelandic prime minister Geir Haarde.

References

External links 
 
 Skavlan at SVT 
 Skavlan at NRK 
 

2009 Norwegian television series debuts
2009 Swedish television series debuts
Sveriges Television original programming
NRK original programming
Norwegian television talk shows
Swedish television talk shows